Derry Lionel Scherhant (born 10 November 2002) is a German professional footballer who plays as a striker for Hertha BSC.

Career
Scherhant is a youth product of Viktoria Berlin, Tennis Borussia Berlin, and Berliner SC, before moving to the youth academy of Hertha BSC in 2020. In the summer of 2021, he was promoted to their B-team in the Regionalliga where he scored 16 goals in 34 appearances in his first season. He signed a professional contract with the senior Hertha BSC squad on 17 June 2022 until 2025. He made his professional debut with Hertha BSC as a late substitute in a 1–1 Bundesliga tie with Eintracht Frankfurt on 13 August 2022.

References

External links
 Profile at the Hertha BSC website
 
 

2002 births
Living people
Footballers from Berlin
German footballers
Hertha BSC players
Hertha BSC II players
Bundesliga players
Regionalliga players
Association football forwards